Clifford Township may refer to the following townships in the United States:

 Clifford Township, Butler County, Kansas
 Clifford Township, Susquehanna County, Pennsylvania